The Dateline Downtown is a student-run newspaper at the University of Houston–Downtown (UHD).  It includes news, features, editorials, photos, and advertising. The newspaper is published semi-weekly—providing news and information to the UHD community.

External links
The Dateline Downtown
University of Houston–Downtown

University of Houston–Downtown
Student newspapers published in Texas